The fjords of the United States are mostly found along the glacial regions of the coasts of Alaska and Washington. These fjords — long narrow inlets in valleys carved by glacial activity — can have two or more basins separated by sills.

Most of the fjords in Washington originate off Puget Sound and the Salish Sea, while fjords in Alaska originate from numerous, more varied locations.

The Hudson River fjord in New York is recognized as the only true Fjord in the eastern coast of the United States

Somes Sound, a fjard located within Acadia National Park, is often mistaken for being another fjord located along the eastern coast of the United States.

List of fjords

See also
List of fjords in Canada

References

 
United States
Fjords